Chatrabus is a genus of toadfishes native to the Atlantic coast of southern Africa.

Species
There are currently three recognized species in this genus:
 Chatrabus felinus (J. L. B. Smith, 1952) (Pleated toadfish)
 Chatrabus hendersoni (J. L. B. Smith, 1952) (Chocolate toadfish)
 Chatrabus melanurus (Barnard, 1927) (Pony toadfish)

References

Batrachoididae